Syed Iqbal Mand Banu is a social worker and mother-in-law of Tarique Rahman. She was awarded the Independence Day Award in 1995. She had published poetry books and does watercolor paintings.

Biography

Banu founded SUROVI in 1979 which provides schooling for child domestic workers with her own maid being the first student of the school.

Banu received the Special Award for women from Kazi Mahbubullah and Begum Zebunnessa Janakalyan Trust in 1988.

Banu was married to Mahbub Ali Khan, former Chief of Naval Staff of Bangladesh Navy. Their daughter, Zubaida Rahman, married Tarique Rahman, son of then Prime Minister Khaleda Zia and former president Ziaur Rahman, in 1993. Banu is the mother-in-law of Tarique Rahman, son of Prime Minister Khaleda Zia.

In 2007, Anti Corruption Commission filed a case against Syed Iqbal Mand Banu, Zubaida Rahman, and Tarique Rahman for 48.1 million taka in unexplained wealth with Kafrul Police Station.

In January 2014,  Anti-Corruption Commission filed a case against Banu for not submitting her wealth statement to the commission.

In 2017, Bangladesh Supreme Court squashed a corruption case against her by Anti-Corruption Commission for improper paperwork.

In June 2019, Banu and other relatives visited former Prime Minister Khaleda Zia, while she was receiving treatment Bangabandhu Sheikh Mujib Medical University, who had been in prison since 8 February 2018.

Bibliography 

 Jhora Pata
 Mone Pore

References

Living people
Recipients of the Independence Day Award
Year of birth missing (living people)
Bangladeshi women poets
Bangladeshi artists
Bangladeshi social workers